Dolphin Man is a documentary film, directed by Lefteris Charitos and released in 2017. An international coproduction, the film profiles French diver Jacques Mayol.

In 2019, Dave Kazala received a Canadian Screen Award nomination for Best Editing in Documentary at the 7th Canadian Screen Awards.

References

External links

2017 films
2017 documentary films
Canadian sports documentary films
Documentary films about underwater diving
French documentary films
Greek documentary films
2010s English-language films
2010s Canadian films
2010s French films